Jungle justice or mob justice is a form of public extrajudicial killings which can found in Nigeria and Cameroon, where an alleged criminal is publicly humiliated, beaten and summarily executed by vigilantes or an angry mob. Treatments can vary from a "muddy treatment", where the alleged criminal is forced to roll in mud for hours to severe beatings followed by execution by necklacing. This form of street justice occurs where a dysfunctional and corrupt judiciary system and law enforcement have "lost all credibility. European principles of justice have likewise become discredited."

Notable examples include the Bakassi Boys and the Aluu four lynching.

See also
 Frontier justice - Extrajudicial killings in the American Wild West

References

Capital punishment
Criminal law
Human rights abuses
Extrajudicial killings
Vigilantism